The Revue Médicale de Bruxelles (English: Medical Journal of Brussels) is a bimonthly peer-reviewed medical journal published by the Association des Médecins issus de l'Université libre de Bruxelles. It covers all aspects of medicine, especially as relevant "for the continuing-education training of specialists and general practitioners". The editor-in-chief is Stéphane Louryan (Université libre de Bruxelles). The journal is published in French with bilingual abstracts (French and English). It was established in 1896 as Journal Médical de Bruxelles until 1914 ceasing publication during World War I. The journal resumed in 1921 until a new title, Bruxelles Médical. It obtained its current title in 1944, with volume numbering restarting at 1 in 1980.

Abstracting and indexing 
The journal is abstracted and indexed in Index Medicus/MEDLINE/PubMed.

References

External links 
 

French-language journals
General medical journals
Publications established in 1896
Bimonthly journals
Academic journals published by learned and professional societies
1896 establishments in Belgium